Charles Wilson Harris (1771 – January 15, 1804) was briefly presiding professor (equivalent of a modern-day university president)  of the University of North Carolina during 1796.

Biography

Early life
Charles Wilson Harris was born in 1771. He was the son of Col. Robert Harris (1737-1803) of Poplar Tent and Mary Wilson. His elementary education was at a classical school conducted in association with the Poplar Tent Presbyterian Church, of which his father was a presiding elder. He then attended the College of New Jersey (now Princeton University) and was awarded the Mathematical Oration at his 1792 graduation.

Career
Harris was a close associate of William Richardson Davie.  He was Davie's law clerk and assumed Davie's legal caseload during the latter's absences from Halifax, North Carolina when he was governor and ambassador to France.

He served as the second presiding professor (now known as university president) of the University of North Carolina at Chapel Hill in Chapel Hill, North Carolina, in 1796.

Personal life
He was a freemason. He never got married.

Death
He died of consumption on January 15, 1804.

References

1771 births
1804 deaths
People from Chapel Hill, North Carolina
Princeton University alumni
American Freemasons
Leaders of the University of North Carolina at Chapel Hill
19th-century deaths from tuberculosis
Tuberculosis deaths in North Carolina